The Appeal of Montpellier is a political manifesto of French politicians formed in November 2009 in support of same-sex marriage in France.

Signatories
 Hélène Mandroux, mayor of Montpellier
 Patrick Bloche, mayor of the 11th arrondissement of Paris, member of the National Assembly for the 7th constituency of Paris
 Joaquim Pueyo, mayor of Alençon
 Laure Dael, mayor of Andelys
 Jean-Claude Antonini, mayor of Angers
 Annonay, Olivier Dussopt
 Bègles, Noël Mamere
 Carrière-sous-Poissy, Eddie Ait
 Dieppe, Sébastien Jumel
 Dieulefit, Christine Priotto
 La Ferté Saint Aubin, Philippe Froment
 Marc Vuillemot La Seyne-sur-Mer
 Maud Olivier, mayor of Les Ulis
 Martine Aubry, mayor of Lille
 Nathalie Perrin-Gilbert, NA deputy for 1st arrondissement of Lyon
 Lyon 3rd, Thierry Philip
 Lyon 4ème, Dominique Bolliet
 Lyon 5ème, Alexandrine Pesson
 Lyon 7ème, Jean-Pierre Flaconneche
 Lyon 8ème, Christian Coulon
 Lyon 9ème, Alain Giordano
 Mareau aux Près, Bertrand Hauchecorne
 Moëlan-sur-Mer, Nicolas Morvan
 Montreuil, Dominique Voynet
 Palaiseau, François Lamy
 Paris 10ème, Rémy Feraud
 Paris 19ème, Roger Madec
 Paris 2ème, Jacques Boutault
 Paris 4ème, Dominique Bertinotti
 Paris 9ème, Jacques Bravo
 Paris, Bertrand Delanoë
 Poissy, Frédérik Bernard
 Reims, Adeline Hazan
 Rennes, Daniel Delaveau
 Rouen, Valérie Fourneyron
 Saint-Amans-Roche-Savine, André Chassaigne
 Tomblaine (Gd Nancy), Hervé Feron
 Villeurbanne, Jean-Louis Bret
 Chalon sur Saône, Christophe Sirugue
 Conflans Ste Honorine, Philippe Esnol
 Grabels, René Revol
 Malakoff, Catherine Margate
 Salon-de-Provence, Michel Tonon
 Toulouse, Pierre Cohen
 Unieux, Christophe Faverjon

Observers
 Jordi Hereu, Mayor of Barcelona
 Martine Martinel (Député Haute Garonne)
 Jean-Charles Taddei, Human Rights League
 Hussein Bourgi, Collective Against Homophobia
 Le Refuge
 Lesbian & Gay Pride
 Arc en Ciel
 Marie-George Buffet
 Cécile Duflot
 Jean-Louis Touraine, deputy, 2nd deputy mayor of Lyon.

External links
 Appeal of Montpellier

Same-sex marriage in France
2009 in France
2009 in LGBT history
November 2009 events in Europe